Muchow is a municipality  in the Ludwigslust-Parchim district, in Mecklenburg-Vorpommern, Germany.

Geography and transport links
The parish which is surrounded by fields lies in a sparsely populated region ten kilometres southeast of Neustadt-Glewe and 10 kilometres northeast of Grabow. The Müritz-Elde Aqueduct runs along the western boundary of the parish. A small river, the Tarnitz flows south through the area to join the Löcknitz. The Bundesautobahn 24 may be reached via the junction of Neustadt-Glewe about 10 kilometres away.

References

Ludwigslust-Parchim